The 2011–12 Taça da Liga was the fifth edition of the Portuguese Taça da Liga. The first matches were played on 31 July 2011. The final was played on 14 April 2012, with Benfica defeating Gil Vicente 2–1 to win their fourth consecutive Taça da Liga.

Format
This seasons' format consists of 3 rounds, plus knockout stages. In the first round, only second division teams play. All 16 teams are allocated into 4 groups of 4 teams each. Each team plays 3 matches and top two of each group advances. In the second round, teams that qualified from previous round are joined by the two Liga Sagres promoted teams and also the 6 worst in the top league in the previous season. There will be two-legged fixtures in which the winners will advance. The third round is where the remaining top 8 teams from previous season first division enter the competition. Again, as in the first round, the 16 teams are divided into 4 groups and each team will play 3 matches. However this time, only group winners advance. Both semi-finals and finals are one-legged fixtures.

Participating clubs
 Clubs starting from the first round: Arouca, Atlético CP, Belenenses, Covilhã, Desportivo das Aves, Estoril, Freamunde, Leixões, Moreirense, Naval, Oliveirense, Penafiel, Portimonense, Santa Clara, Trofense, União da Madeira
 Clubs starting from the second round: Académica, Beira-Mar, Feirense, Gil Vicente, Marítimo, Olhanense, União de Leiria, Vitória de Setúbal
 Clubs starting from the third round: Benfica, Braga, Nacional, Paços de Ferreira, Porto, Rio Ave, Sporting CP, Vitória de Guimarães

First round

Group A

Group B

Group C

Group D

Second round
The 2011–12 Taça da Liga Second Round matches were played on 8, 9, 26 and 27 October 2011 for the first legs whilst the second legs took place on 9, 12 and 13 November 2011. The winners over the two legs progressed to the third round.

First leg

Second leg 

Vitória de Setúbal won 4-3 on aggregate.

Feirense 2-2 Portimonense on aggregate. Portimonense won 5-4 on penalties.

Estoril won 4-3 on aggregate.

Moreirense won 4-3 on aggregate.

Marítimo won 5-2 on aggregate.

Gil Vicenre won 3-2 on aggregate.

Santa Clara won 3-2 on aggregate.

Penafiel won 2-1 on aggregate.

Third round
The 2011–12 Taça da Liga Third Round group stage matches are to be played in January and February 2012. The eight winners of the two legged Second Round matches progressed to this round and are joined by the teams who finished in the top eight of the 2010–11 Primeira Liga. The sixteen teams will be seeded depending on their league position from the previous season. The sixteen teams involved in this round would be split into four groups from group A to D.  The first round matches of the group stage took place on 21 December 2011 and 2–3 January 2012, the second-round games took place on 18 January and the third round matches took place on 2–3 February 2012. The winners of each group would progress to the semi final stage to be played on the 21 March 2012.

Participating teams
Names in bold are the colloquial names of the clubs. Estoril, Gil Vicente, Marítimo, Moreirense, Penafiel, Portimonense, Santa Clara, Vitória de Setúbal all progressed from the second round to this phase. Benfica, Nacional, Paços de Ferreira, Porto, Rio Ave, Sporting CP, Braga and Vitória de Guimarães started their campaign at this stage.

 Sport Lisboa e Benfica
 Grupo Desportivo Estoril-Praia
 Gil Vicente Futebol Clube
 Club Sport Marítimo
 Moreirense Futebol Clube
 Clube Desportivo Nacional "da Madeira"
 Futebol Clube Paços de Ferreira
 Futebol Clube de Penafiel

 Portimonense Sporting Clube
 Futebol Clube do Porto
 Rio Ave Futebol Clube
 Clube Desportivo Santa Clara
 Sporting Clube de Portugal
 Sporting Clube de Braga
 Vitória Sport Clube "de Guimarães"
 Vitória Futebol Clube "de Setúbal"

Draw
The draw for the third round took place on 23 November 2012 at 12:00 at the LPFP headquarters in Lisbon, Portugal. The teams involved in this round were seeded according to their league position from either the 2010–11 Primeira Liga or the 2010–11 Liga de Honra depending in which division they played in last season.

Groups

Group A

Group B

Group C

Group D

Knockout phase

Semi-finals

Final

Statistics

Top goalscorers
As of the 14 April 2012 23:19 (UTC)

References

External links
Official webpage 
Official regulation 
Official statistics 

2011-12
2011–12 European domestic association football cups
2011–12 in Portuguese football